A per cent mille or pcm is one one-thousandth of a percent. It can be thought of as a "milli-percent". It is commonly used in epidemiology, and in nuclear reactor engineering as a unit of reactivity.

Epidemiology
Statistics of crime rates, mortality and disease prevalence in a population are often given in

Nuclear Reactivity
In nuclear reactor engineering, a per cent mille is equal to one-thousandth of a percent of the reactivity, denoted by Greek lowercase letter rho. Reactivity is a dimensionless unit representing a departure from criticality, calculated by:
 
where keff denotes the effective multiplication factor for the reaction. Therefore, one pcm is equal to:
 
This unit is commonly used in the operation of light-water reactor sites because reactivity values tend to be small, so measuring in pcm allows reactivity to be expressed using whole numbers.

Related units 
 Percentage point difference of 1 part in 100
 Percentage (%) 1 part in 100
 Per mille (‰) 1 part in 1,000
 Basis point (bp) difference of 1 part in 10,000
 Permyriad (‱) 1 part in 10,000
 Parts-per notation including parts-per million, parts-per billion etc

See also 
 InHour (another unit of reactivity)
 Dollar (reactivity)
 Parts-per notation
 Per-unit system
 Percent point function

Notes

Units of measurement